Cynthia is a 1947 American comedy-drama film starring Mary Astor, Elizabeth Taylor, and George Murphy. The film is based on the 1945 play The Rich, Full Life by Viña Delmar and was adapted by screenwriters Harold Buchman and Charles Kaufman.

Plot
In school, baseball hero Larry Bishop (George Murphy) impresses a girl, Louise (Mary Astor), and they fall in love. Both coincidentally have dreams of traveling to Vienna, Austria someday to continue their education, Larry in medicine, Louise in music.

While still in college, Louise and Larry marry, Louise becomes pregnant, and they move to Larry’s hometown in Illinois, a small town called Napoleon. He takes a job in Dingle's hardware store and they raise their daughter, Cynthia (Elizabeth Taylor), who has chronic health problems and is quite frail. Fifteen years later, the Bishops are having trouble making ends meet, Larry can't afford to buy the home that they rent, and they no longer have any illusions about the adventurous lives they intended to lead.

Dr. Fred Jannings (Gene Lockhart), Larry’s brother-in-law, has been the family's physician since Cynthia's birth, and he strongly recommends against her doing any strenuous activities. Louise ignores this advice and lets Cynthia take a role in the school musical, but her health fails, causing Larry to be upset with his wife.

Cynthia falls for a classmate, Ricky Latham (James Lydon), in the meantime. Louise encourages them to go together to the school prom - Cynthia's first ever date, over her husband's objections.  But as the bills and worries mount, Larry loses his patience and his job one day after his boss, J.M. Dingle (Harlan Briggs), objects to his coming late to work. After returning home, Larry tells Louise that they can now leave Napoleon and go to Chicago.  But Louise has decided to use her money to buy the house, and Cynthia no longer wants to go either, because she is now going steady with Ricky. In the end, the family unites to embrace the future, satisfied when Larry's boss comes back, hat in hand, asking him to return to his job.

Cast
 Elizabeth Taylor as Cynthia Bishop
 George Murphy as Larry Bishop
 S. Z. Sakall as Professor Rosenkrantz
 Mary Astor as Louise Bishop
 Gene Lockhart as Dr. Fred I. Jannings
 Spring Byington as Carrie Jannings
 James Lydon as Ricky Latham
 Scotty Beckett as Will Parker
 Carol Brannan as Fredonia Jannings
 Anna Q. Nilsson as Miss Brady
 Morris Ankrum as Mr. Phillips, the High-School Principal
 Kathleen Howard as McQuillan
 Shirley Johns as Stella Regan
 Barbara Challis as Alice
 Harlan Briggs as J.M. Dingle
 Will Wright as Gus Wood
 Minerva Urecal as Maid (uncredited)

Reception
According to MGM records, the film earned $1,206,000 in the U.S. and Canada and $442,00 in other markets, resulting in a loss of $280,000.

References

External links
 
 Cynthia at TCMDB
 
 

1947 comedy-drama films
American comedy-drama films
1940s English-language films
American black-and-white films
American films based on plays
Films directed by Robert Z. Leonard
Films scored by Bronisław Kaper
Metro-Goldwyn-Mayer films
Films with screenplays by Buster Keaton
Films based on works by Viña Delmar
1940s American films